Pete Morton (born 30 July 1964) is an English folk singer-songwriter who lives in London, England. According to fRoots, Morton "is amongst the best that the British roots music scene has produced in living memory."

Biography
Morton was born in Leicester, England, on 30 July 1964. He attended Countesthorpe Community College where he spent most of his time in the music block learning guitar and playing new wave and punk songs. He was lead singer, songwriter and rhythm guitarist in his two school bands: The Mafia, and Tone Deaf. He left school at 16 in 1980. It was during this summer that he discovered folk music, when hearing a friend's father playing a Buffy Sainte-Marie record. This had a profound effect which led him to buy an acoustic guitar and learn songs from early 60s protest singers.

Morton started busking and visiting folk clubs, travelling around the UK and Europe. He began learning traditional songs as well as writing his own songs mainly of social commentary. In a 1987 interview Morton said "I don't want to be seen as a Political Songwriter. Lately I've wanted to write more about personal experiences, which is harder than writing about issues."

Morton signed to Harbourtown Records in 1987, a label started by Gordon Jones and Bob Thomas of Scottish Folk Band, Silly Wizard. His first album, Frivolous Love was met with high critical acclaim, of which The Guardian called him "a revelation" and was voted the most promising newcomer by FRoots magazine the year after. 
His second album, One Big Joke (1988), was also positively received and he was referred to in a review by FRoots, as one of the best the British roots scene has produced in living memory. The first album he released on CD was Mad World Blues (1992).  Reviewing it, Billboard described him as a "Veteran folk singer-songwriter" whose work displayed "style and confidence", and compared him to Bob Dylan.

Throughout the early nineties Pete toured extensively with Roger Wilson (fiddle, vocals and Guitar) and Simon Edwards (Button accordion and vocals) throughout Europe as 'Urban Folk', producing a powerful and unique rocky-folk sound and recorded a double CD of this collaboration on Harbourtown Records: Self Destructive Fools. 

With Courage, love and Grace (1994) Morton brought his songwriting back to public attention, as well as "utilizing his commanding, edgy voice to enhance the power of his songs". He followed this with a collection of traditional songs on the CD, Trespass (1998). Over the next decade Morton toured extensively in North America and Europe, and produced a CD with Jo Freya as well as three more CDs of his own songs: Hunting the Heart (2000), Swarthmoor (2003), and Flying an Unknown Flag (2005).

In 2007, Morton left Harbourtown Records to re-work his most requested songs with the album Napoleon Jukebox (2007), followed a year later with Casa Abierta (2008). This was a collection of songs in ten different languages, of which he had a teacher for each song, and the album was partly in aid of the Gambian schools trust. It was produced with Simon Squire in Crewkerne, Somerset, England.  Economy (2011) was a CD of original songs, produced by Dawson Smith. 

Morton has also performed as the dancer and singer, Geoff Chaucer Junior – a comedy character, performing A Random History of Rock n Roll in Middle English throughout the UK, and more recently as Master of Ceremonies in Mick Ryan's folk musical Here at the Fair which explores the lives of travelling show people.

With Fellside Recordings Morton produced The Frappin’ and Ramblin’ Pete Morton (2014) which focused on his 'frap' (folk-rap) style, inspired by the ‘talking blues’ of Woody Guthrie and others.
In 2015, again with Fellside, Morton produced The Land of Time. On it he creates "contemporary folk songs which aren’t afraid to face up to some of the more pressing issues of our time with wit, intelligence and nuance." Instrumental backing includes Jon Brindley (guitar), James Budden (double bass), Ciaran Algar (fiddle, banjo, bouzouki) and Chris Parkinson (piano). It was included in Folk Radio's 15 best albums of 2015.

In Game Of Life (2016, Fellside Recordings) Morton worked with Chester-based band Full House to record a collection of both new songs and new versions of his most popular songs.  As a result of working with the band, the familiar material is "revived, refreshed and reinvigorated" and in some cases deeply revisioned.

A Golden Thread (2020) takes its title from a Pete Seeger song, ‘Oh Had I A Golden Thread’.  It includes both traditional and modern songs. The album was recorded at Field Street Recording Studios, Leek, with Paul Yarrow. Morton worked with the Peace Through Folk Choir and its organiser, Malcolm Hawksworth.

Discography
 Frivolous Love (1987)
 One Big Joke (1988)
 Mad World Blues (1992)
 Courage, Love And Grace (1995)
 Jo Freya & Pete Morton (1997)
 Trespass (1998)
 Hunting The Heart (2000)
 Another Train: A Selection From Recordings 1987 – 2001 (2001) – compilation CD
 Swarthmoor (2003)
 Flying An Unknown Flag (2005)
 Napoleon Jukebox (2007) – new performances of 17 best known songs
 Casa Abierta: Ten Songs In Different Tongues, Volume One (2008)
 Economy (2011)
 The Frappin' And Ramblin' Pete Morton (2014)
 The Land Of Time (2015)
 Game of Life (2015)
 A Golden Thread (2020)

References

External links
Official website

1964 births
English folk singers
English male singer-songwriters
English buskers
Living people
Musicians from London